Carsten Richardson was an early 17th-century Holsteinian-Danish naval officer and Arctic explorer. He was the commander of King Christian IV's final expedition to Greenland.

Carsten Richardson was in command of one of five ships in the 1606 expedition to Greenland led by Godske Lindenov and sent by Christian IV of Denmark to locate the lost Eastern Norse Settlement and to assert Danish sovereignty. Dense sea ice prevented them from landing on the Greenland coast, which was in sight.

Notes 
Mills, William James (2003) Exploring Polar Frontiers: A Historical Encyclopedia – 2 vols. Santa Barbara, CA USA. pp. 548-549: Carsten Richardson

See also 
Cartographic expeditions to Greenland
List of Arctic expeditions

Year of birth unknown
Year of death unknown
Scandinavian explorers of North America
Greenlandic polar explorers
Danish polar explorers
Explorers of the Arctic
History of Greenland